Erin Karpluk (born ) is a Canadian actress. She is known for her portrayal of Erica Strange on the CBC Television series Being Erica from 2009 to 2011.

Early life
Karpluk was born in Jasper, Alberta to a mother who was a high-school principal and a father who was a railway engineer. She is of Ukrainian descent. She majored in theatre at the University of Victoria and received a Bachelor of Fine Arts degree in 2000.

Career 
Karpluk began her acting career in Vancouver. Between 2000 and 2005, she appeared in more than a dozen television movies and series before landing the role of Kate in Godiva's. Her work during this period included "Voice of Sylan" in the final episode of Dark Angel and the TV movie Family Sins. She was also in a short-lived US television series called Glory Days in 2002.

In 2004, she appeared in Legend of Earthsea and played a serial killer in Ripper 2: Letter from Within. She earned a Leo nomination for her first season of Godiva's and a 2006 Gemini nomination for Best Performance by an Actress in a Continuing Leading Dramatic Role.

After Godiva's, Karpluk continued to work in television and short films. In 2007, she appeared in Bionic Woman, Flash Gordon, and The L Word. She had a leading role in a 2008 television movie, Smokejumpers, directed by John Terlesky.

Karpluk was offered the lead role of Erica Strange in the CBC Television series Being Erica when she was working in Los Angeles on The L Word. In 2009, Karpluk won the Gemini award for Best Performance by an Actress in a Continuing Leading Dramatic Role for her portrayal of the titular character.

She also had a recurring role as Alice the radio station manager during the first season of The CW's Life Unexpected. Her only appearance during the second season was in the series finale because of the scheduling conflict that resulted when Being Erica was picked up for a third year. Karpluk has also had recurring roles on Rookie Blue and Slasher, and starred in the web series Riftworld.

Since 2017, she has had a recurring supporting role on the Hallmark Movies & Mysteries series Fixer Upper Mysteries.

Filmography

Film

Television

Awards

References

External links
 
 

Year of birth missing (living people)
21st-century Canadian actresses
Actresses from Alberta
Canadian film actresses
Canadian people of Ukrainian descent
Canadian television actresses
Best Actress in a Drama Series Canadian Screen Award winners
People from Jasper, Alberta
Living people
University of Victoria alumni